Manuel Alejandro García Muñíz (born July 31, 1988, in Cuernavaca, Morelos) is a Mexican professional footballer who played for Murciélagos of Ascenso MX.

References 

1988 births
Living people
Association footballers not categorized by position
Footballers from Morelos
Irapuato F.C. footballers
Liga MX players
Murciélagos FC footballers
Sportspeople from Cuernavaca
21st-century Mexican people
Mexican footballers